The Jane LRT is an inactive proposal for a light rail line in Toronto, Ontario, Canada. It was originally proposed in 2007, cancelled in 2010, and later revived in the 2013 "Feeling Congested?" report by the City of Toronto, where it was labelled as a "Future Transit Project". However, in April 2019, Ontario Premier Doug Ford announced the province's plans for rapid transit development and funding for the Greater Toronto Area that omitted the Jane LRT.

History
It was originally part of the Transit City proposal announced in March 2007, to be operated by the Toronto Transit Commission. It was planned as the sixth of the seven Transit City lines to be completed.

The Jane LRT was cancelled by Rob Ford in December 2010 when he announced the cancellation of the entire Transit City project. While LRT lines on Sheppard East, Finch West, and Eglinton were revived through a new agreement between the City of Toronto and Metrolinx, the Jane LRT was not included at the time.

The Jane LRT is still included in Metrolinx's proposed regional transportation plan. In February 2016, City of Toronto planners and the TTC also recommended implementing the Jane LRT within 15 years. In January 2018, the Jane LRT was tentatively listed as "Line 8" in the TTC's 2018–2022 corporate plan. Aspects of the Jane LRT are currently incorporated into the 935 Jane Express bus which follows the LRT routing.

On April 10, 2019, Ontario Premier Doug Ford outlined the province's plans for rapid transit development and funding for the Greater Toronto Area. These plans did not include the Jane LRT.

Route layout
Ridership was estimated to be 24 million trips in 2021.

Instead of turning onto Steeles Avenue towards Pioneer Village, The Big Move illustrates the Jane LRT running north into York Region and terminating at Vaughan Metropolitan Centre station.

Proposed stops/stations
 Bloor Street West at Jane station (connection to Line 2 Bloor–Danforth)
 Ardagh Street (surface LRT option only)
 Annette Street
 St. John's Road (surface LRT option only)
 St. Clair Avenue West (connection to future 512 St. Clair streetcar extension)
 Woolner Avenue (potential stop, surface LRT option only)
 Outlook Avenue
 Eglinton Avenue West (connection to Eglinton West extension of Line 5)
 Weston Road
 Trethewey Drive (surface LRT option only)
 Lawrence Avenue West
 John Street (potential stop, surface LRT option only)
 Maple Leaf Drive
 Falstaff Avenue (surface LRT option only)
 Wilson Avenue
 Heathrow Drive
 Exbury Road
 Giltspur Drive
 Sheppard Avenue West
 Rita Drive
 Grandravine Drive
 Yorkwoods Gate
 Yewtree Boulevard (potential stop)
 Finch Avenue West (connection to future Line 6 Finch West)
 York Gate Boulevard
 Driftwood Avenue
 Shoreham Drive
 Steeles Avenue West
 Murray Ross Parkway 
 York University at Pioneer Village station (connection to Line 1 Yonge–University)

See also
 Toronto streetcar system

References

Toronto streetcar system
Light rail in Canada
Transit City
Proposed Toronto rapid transit projects
The Big Move projects